Bart Lundy (born November 5, 1971) is an American men's college basketball coach, who currently holds the head coach position for the Milwaukee Panthers men's basketball team. He was head coach at Queens University of Charlotte from 2013–2022, and previously an assistant coach at the University of North Texas from 2012–2013. Before going to North Texas, Lundy was the Director of Basketball Operations at Marquette University from 2009–2012. He is a native of Galax, Virginia.

During his college years he played at the University of North Carolina at Pembroke before transferring to Lenoir–Rhyne University. Before moving to Marquette, he was the head coach of the men's basketball team at High Point University from 2003–2009. Lundy's first head coaching job was at Queens University of Charlotte from 1998–2003 and his teams went to the NCAA Div. II Tournament three times in six seasons. He was named the Conference Carolinas Coach of the Year in 2000–01.

Head coaching record

References

1971 births
Living people
American men's basketball coaches
American men's basketball players
Basketball coaches from Virginia
Basketball players from Virginia
College men's basketball head coaches in the United States
High Point Panthers men's basketball coaches
Lenoir–Rhyne Bears men's basketball players
Milwaukee Panthers men's basketball coaches
People from Galax, Virginia
Queens Royals men's basketball coaches
UNC Pembroke Braves basketball players
Winthrop Eagles men's basketball coaches